Fritz Genschow (15 May 1905 – 21 June 1977) was a German actor, film director and screenwriter.

Selected filmography

 Hands Up, Eddy Polo (1929) - Russenphilipp
 Beyond the Street (1929) - Der Arbeitsloser / The Unemployed man
 Inherited Passions (1929) - Ottokar Kiekebusch
 Kennst Du das Land (1931) - Silvano
 Gesangverein Sorgenfrei (1931) - Fritz
 Morgenrot (1933) - Oberleutnant 'Phipps' Fredericks
 Refugees (1933) - Hermann
 Au bout du monde (1934) - Le sibérien
 The Sporck Battalion (1934) - Leutnant v. Naugaard
 Holiday From Myself (1934) - Erich Bürger, Büroangestellter
 Hundert Tage (1935) - Lucien
 Joan of Arc (1935) - Hauptmann
 Eine Seefahrt, die ist lustig (1935) - Fritz Schmitz
 The Student of Prague (1935) - Dahl
 Hangmen, Women and Soldiers (1935) - Buschke
 Die Entführung (1936) - Bobby Biscot
 Die letzte Fahrt der Santa Margareta (1936) - Zollkapitän Holt
 Street Music (1936) - Hans Lünk - Straßenmusikant
 Eine Nacht mit Hindernissen (1937) - Rolf Eltze - Erster Offizier der 'Nymphe'
 Dangerous Crossing (1937) - Fritz Buchholz - U-Bahn-Beamter
 Talking About Jacqueline (1937) - Lionel Clark
 Wie der Hase läuft (1937) - Gustav Hase, Bahnhofsvorsteher
 Ein Volksfeind (1937) - Kapitän Holster
 Geld fällt vom Himmel (1938) - Gusdav Pasemann
 Dreizehn Mann und eine Kanone (1938)
 Drei Unteroffiziere (1939) - Unteroffizier Fritz Kohlhammer
 Roman eines Arztes (1939) - Schofför Dr. Üdings
 Sommer, Sonne, Erika (1939) - Fritz Brochet
 Verdacht auf Ursula (1939) - Gutsinspektor Arndt
 Rote Mühle (1940)
 Twilight (1940) - Forstmeister Jürgens
 Left of the Isar, Right of the Spree (1940) - Alfred Schulze
 Friedrich Schiller – The Triumph of a Genius (1940) - Student Kapff
 Floh im Ohr (1943) - Großknecht Karl Lührmann
 Titanic (1943) - Landarbeiter Henry (uncredited)
 So ein Affentheater (1953)
 Little Red Riding Hood (1953) - Jäger
 Hänsel und Gretel (1954)
 Struwwelpeter (1955, director, based on Struwwelpeter) - Erzähler
 Ina, Peter und die Rasselbande (1955) - Tobbi
 The Priest from Kirchfeld (1955) - Franz Wagner, Eisenbahner
 Cinderella (1955) - Der Vater / Father
 Sleeping Beauty (1955) - König
 The Wishing-Table (1956) - Woodworker
 Kalle wird Bürgermeister (1957)
 Die Gänsemagd (1957)
 Schneewittchen (1959) - (final film role)

External links

1905 births
1977 deaths
German male film actors
Film people from Berlin
Male actors from Berlin
20th-century German male actors
German male writers
Rundfunk im amerikanischen Sektor people
Burials at the Waldfriedhof Zehlendorf